Agrupación Deportiva Cerro de Reyes Badajoz Atlético is a Spanish football team based in Badajoz, in the autonomous community of Extremadura. Founded in 1980, the club is not registered in any competition. Its home matches were held at Estadio José Pache.

History
In July 2006 Cerro de Reyes' president saved CD Badajoz from folding, by assisting in the latter's debts. Subsequently, Cerro took the other club's place in the third division, with Badajoz falling to the fourth.

In 2008–09 the team won Group 14 in the fourth level. In the play-offs it eventually promoted to division three for the first time in its history, after beating UD Los Barrios 2–0 on aggregate.

In its first season in the third division, Cerro de Reyes maintained its status after finishing in 14th position – Enzo Noir was the side's top scorer with 15 goals. However, in the following campaign, as the club was immersed in a severe economic crisis, many players left it in the winter transfer window, leading to the team's non-appearance for two matches in a row, which eventually led to its exclusion from the league and consequent relegation.

Season to season

3 seasons in Segunda División B
9 seasons in Tercera División

Current squad
As of November 2009.

Famous coaches
 Luis Cordero
 Paco Miranda
 Andrés García Tébar
 Tinin

Stadium
Cerro de Reyes held home matches at Estadio José Pache, which has a capacity of 3,500 spectators. Located on the Avd. Jaime Montero de Espinosa street, S/N.

References

External links
Official website 
Futbolme team profile 
Fansite 

Cerro Reyes
Cerro Reyes
Cerro Reyes
1980 establishments in Spain
Cerro Reyes